Königswarter is a Jewish Austrian-Hungarian noble family originating from Königswart, Bohemia. In the middle of the eighteenth century, their ancestor Jonas Hirsch Königswarter emigrated to Fürth, Bavaria, where he established a business that made him wealthy. At his death (1805) he left five sons, who founded banking houses successively in Frankfurt, Vienna, Amsterdam, and Hamburg.

Family tree 

 Jonas Hirsch Königswarter ( 1740–1805)
 Hermann Hirsch Königswarter (1767–1847)
 Markus Königswarter (1770–1850)
 Jonas von Königswarter (1807–1871)
 Fanny von Königswarter (1830–1852)
  (1837–1893), married to Charlotte Edle von Wertheimstein (1841–1929)
 Heinrich Königswarter (1861–1931)
 Hermann Königswarter (1864–1915)
 Wilhelm Königswarter (1866–1927)
 Zacharias Markus Königswarter (1812–1872)
  (1818–1877)
  (1778–1854), married to Lisette Lämelsfeld von Lämel ( 1778–1814), sister of Simon von Lämel (1766–1845)
 Fanny Königswarter (1804–1861), married to Adolph Meyer (1807–1866)
  (1809–1887)
 Moritz Königswarter (1780–1829)
 Josefine Königswarter (1811–1861), married to her cousin Jonas von Königswarter
 Julius Jonas Königswarter (1783–1845)
  (1814–1878)
 Jules Kœnigswarter (1844–1919)
 Louis de Kœnigswarter (1870–1931)
 Jules de Kœnigswarter (1904–1995), married to Pannonica Rothschild (1913–1988)
 Hélène Joséphine Kœnigswarter (1873–1922), married to Gaston Calmann-Lévy (1864–1948)
  (1878–1963), married to Fernand Halphen (1872–1917)
 Wilhelm Königswarter (1816–1857)
  (1854–1918)
  (1890–1966)
  (1817–1878)
 Maurice de Kœnigswarter (1858–1938)
 Henri Kœnigswarter (1819–1876)
 Jules Kœnigswarter (1848–1882)

References 

 

Bohemian Jews
Jewish-German families
Jewish-Hungarian families
Noble families